Asura snelleni is a moth of the family Erebidae. It is found on Java.

Subspecies
Asura snelleni snelleni
Asura snelleni duplicata Niewenhs., 1948 (Bangzaai Archipelago)

References

snelleni
Moths described in 1943
Moths of Indonesia